Lucky Luke is an animated television series based on the comic book series of the same name created by a Belgian cartoonist Morris. The series lasted for 26 episodes, and co-produced by Hanna-Barbera, Gaumont, Extrafilm and FR3. In France, the series was broadcast from 15 October 1984 on FR3. In the United States, the show aired in syndication on various CBS and ABC stations.

Synopsis
Lucky Luke is a solitary street-smart cowboy traveling through the Far West. Accompanied by his faithful horse Jolly Jumper and almost every episode by Rantanplan the prison guard dog (who gets lost in the West by wanting to follow Lucky Luke or find his prison), he finds himself confronted with various bandits and thugs like the Dalton Brothers, Billy the Kid, Jesse James, and Phil Defer.

Voice cast

Additional Voices
Original: Marion Game
English: Peter Cullen, Pat Fraley, Barbara Goodson, Mona Marshall

Episodes

Production
The opening credits were directed by Philippe Landrot. This series is broadcast in installments of 5 minutes every day in access prime time, followed by a full broadcast on Sunday afternoon (on FR3). Three episodes ("The Daltons in the Blizzard", "Ma Dalton" and "The Daltons Are Redeemed") were combined in a compilation feature movie: The Daltons on the Loose.

Home media
The complete series was released in October 2010 by Citel Vidéo in 5 volumes. The episodes are in disorder:

Ma Dalton (episodes 1, 6, 19, 22 and 13)
The Diligence (episodes 12, 10, 2, 7, 3, 4)
Calamity Jane (episodes 5, 9, 24, 26, 23)
Billy the Kid (episodes 11, 15, 18, 8, 14)
Jesse James (episodes 21, 25, 20, 17, 16)

References

External links
 

Lucky Luke
Television series based on Belgian comics
1984 American television series debuts
1985 American television series endings
1984 French television series debuts
1985 French television series debuts
1984 German television series debuts
1985 German television series debuts
1980s Western (genre) television series
American children's animated action television series
American children's animated adventure television series
French children's animated action television series
French children's animated adventure television series
German children's animated action television series
German children's animated adventure television series
French-language television shows
Television series by Hanna-Barbera
1980s American animated television series
1980s French animated television series
Western (genre) animated television series